Gary Berkovich, AIA, NCARB (born May 26, 1935, in Kharkiv, Ukrainian SSR, Soviet Union) is an American and Soviet architect, and the first Soviet architect of 1960s – 1980s immigration wave, who had opened his office (Gary A. Berkovich  Associates, 1987) in the United States. Author of about 200 projects of residential and public buildings in the USSR and in the USA. He is a winner of the architectural competitions in the Soviet Union and in the United States. He is also an author of books and professional articles.

Biography 
Gary Berkovich was born to a Jewish family in Ukraine. He had graduated from the Kharkiv Building Technical School (1953) and the Moscow School of Architecture (1964), both with honours. In 1973, he got a PhD from Moscow Housing Design and Research Institute for his thesis, dedicated to the computerization of architectural design ("The problems of an apartment layout optimization solutions"). He worked in architectural firms of Kharkiv, Novosibirsk and Moscow, USSR. Immigrated to the US in 1977. Worked in the office of Skidmore, Owings and Merrill (under architects Myron Goldsmith and Bruce Graham) and at the office of Aubrey J. Greenberg, Chicago, USA. He played a trifling role in a Hollywood movie (1989). In 1985, he received a diploma of the most successful immigrant, in Chicago, USA.

Selected projects 
 Chabad Synagogue, Niles, Illinois (IL), USA. 2006.
 Townhouses’ Development. Wilmette, IL, USA. With an architect, M. Berkovich. 1999.
 Restaurant. Glencoe, IL, USA. The best project of the year award. 1995.
 Single Family Residence. Wilmette, IL, USA1994.
 Single Family Residence. Highland Park, IL, USA. 1992.
 Single Family Residence. Chicago, IL, USA. 1990.
 Single Family Residence. Deerfield, IL, USA. 1988.
 Apartment High-Rise. Chicago, IL, USA. Conceptual design and Design Development. Construction Documents: E. Gordon. Architect of record: A Epstein & Sons. 1987.
 Townhouses’ Development. Chicago, IL, USA. 1986.
 Prototype Palace of Culture. Moscow, USSR. 1974.
 Civic Center of the town of Tereze, Caucasus, USSR. With an architect S. Chemeris. 1973.
 Prototype Apartment Building, Kokushkino, Tataria Region, USSR, 1971
 River Transportation Terminal. Tomsk, Siberia, USSR. 1975.
 Prototype High School for 464 students, 1971
 Prototype Shopping Centre, 1971
 Prototype Kindergarten School, 1971
 Prototype Housing for the South-East Siberia Region, USSR, 1970
 Tombstone, Zaporizhia, USSR, 1969
 Meatpacking Plant, Stupino, Moscow Region, USSR, 1969
 Meatpacking Plant, Dedovsk, Moscow Region, USSR, 1969
 Addition and Remodelling of an Exhibition Pavilion at the All-State Achievement Exhibition (VDNH) grounds, Moscow, USSR, 1969
 Design and Development Project, Town of Nizhniaia Paiva, Altai Region, Siberia, USSR, 1965-1966
 Creative Artist's Union Retreat House, Moscow Region, USSR,    1963-1964
 Prototype rail-road stations. Moscow, USSR. With an architect L. Polonskaya. 1962.

Selected architectural competitions 
 «The Peak» Resort. Hong Kong. International Competition Entry. Author, team leader. 1983.
 Town-house. Logan Square, Chicago, IL, USA. With an architect M. Berkovich. Finalist Award. 1981.
 Town-house. Competition Entry, Chicago, IL, USA. 1977.
 Prototype Single Family Residence. Citation. Moscow, USSR. 1968.
 Prototype 2-story Apartment Building. Citation. Moscow, USSR. 1967. With architects D. Radygin and A. Batalov. 1967.
 Prototype Town-houses. Third Prize. Moscow, USSR. With architects D. Radygin and A. Batalov. 1967.
 Prototype Single Family Residence. Third Prize. Moscow, USSR. With architects D. Radygin and A. Batalov. 1967.
 Prototype Dormitory. Moscow, USSR. With architects D. Radygin and A. Batalov. First Prize. 1967.
 Prototype Memorial Complex for World War II Veterans, 1967–68
 Research and Development Institute, Rzhavki, Moscow Region, Russia, 1968-1969

Patents 
 Prefabricated Residential Tower. Certificate 279001 (USSR), 13 April 1967

Gallery

Select publications

Books 
 Reclaiming a History. Jewish Architects in Imperial Russia and the USSR. Weimar und Rostock: Grunberg Verlag. Volume 1. Late Imperial Russia: 1891–1917. 2021 .
 Reclaiming a History. Jewish Architects in Imperial Russia and the USSR. Weimar und Rostock: Grunberg Verlag. Volume 2. Soviet Avant-garde: 1917–1933. 2021 .
 Reclaiming a History. Jewish Architects in Imperial Russia and the USSR. Weimar und Rostock: Grunberg Verlag. Volume 3. Socialist Realism: 1933–1955. 2022 .
 Reclaiming a History. Jewish Architects in Imperial Russia and the USSR. Weimar und Rostock: Grunberg Verlag. Volume 4. Modernized Socialist Realism: 1955–1991. 2022 .
 Г. Беркович, Л. Нецветаев. Зодчий Дмитрий Радыгин. — Ульяновск: УлГТУ, 2017. — 125 с. — .
 Watching Communism Fail, 2008. 
 Russian version of the same book: Human Subjects (Подопытные), Moscow, Russian Federation, 2006.
 Capitalism. It's simple,  Moscow, USSR, 1991.
 "SOM Housing Guidelines". Chicago IL, USA. 1982.

Selected articles 
 Modernized Socialist Realism in Soviet Architecture (1955-1991). 2019. https://www.academia.edu/41858215/Modernized_Socialist_Realism_in_Soviet_Architecture_1955_1991_
 Dom-Kommuna as Realization of Communist Beliefs in 1920's Soviet Union. 2018. https://www.academia.edu/42016381/Dom_Kommuna_as_Realization_of_Communist_Beliefs_in_1920s_Soviet_Union 
 Беркович, Г. А. Архитектор-ученый: штрихи к портрету Александра Рябушина // Современная архитектура мира. Вып. 3 / НИИ теории и истории архитектуры и градостр-ва РААСН; отв. ред. Н. А. Коновалова. — М. ; СПб. : Нестор-История, 2013. — С. 19–23. — .
 «Scaling the Peak Hong Kong». Inland Architect, 1984, no. 12.
 «Encountering the Constructivists». Inland Architect, 1981, no. 10.
 «The Russian Experience: Architecture and Energy». Inland Architect, 1981, no. 9.
 «Methodology for evaluating the quality of flexible layouts in apartments» («О методе оценки планировочного качества трансформируемых квартир»). Collection of research works: Problems of planning and development of rural settlements — design and construction of residential and institutional buildings (Вопросы планировки и застройки сельских населённых мест, проектирования и строительства жилых и общественных зданий), No 2, 1973, p. 141. УДК 711.4+728+725+69.
 «Comfort and convenience in apartment layout optimization» («К проблеме оптимизации планировочного комфорта жилища»). Collection of research works: Problems of planning and development of rural settlements — design and construction of residential and institutional buildings (Вопросы планировки и застройки сельских населённых мест, проектирования и строительства жилых и общественных зданий), No 1, 1972, p. 123. УДК 711.4+69+728.12.
 «Apartment Design Optimization» («Оптимизация планировочных решений квартиры»). Higher Education Institutions’ News. Building and architecture (Известия Высших Учебных Заведений. Строительство и Архитектура), 1966, No 6.

Book reviewing 
 Юнаков О. Архитектор Иосиф Каракис. — Нью-Йорк: Алмаз, 2016. — 544 с. — .

Notes

References 
 Udo Kultermann. Contemporary architecture in Eastern Europe (Zeitgenossische Architektur in Osteuropa). Germany, 1985, pp. 65–66.
 Magazine: «Architecture USSR», Moscow, USSR (Архитектура СССР. Москва, СССР) 1974, No 2.
 Magazine: «The Housing Construction», Moscow, USSR (Жилищное строительство. Москва, СССР) 1973, No 9;1971, No 8; 1970, No 12.
 Magazine: «Architecture» Sofia, Bulgaria (Архитектура. София, Болгария) 1972, No 9.
 Z. M. Oseledchik. Townhouses (З. М. Оселедчик. Блокированные дома), Moscow, USSR. 1969.
 Bagirov, S. B. Moiseyeva. Formation of Community Centers in Rural Settlements (Р.Д Багиров, С. Б. Моисеева. Формирование общественных центров сельских населенных мест), Moscow, USSR. 1972, p. 17. УДК 711.551.
 A. M. Dotlibov, A. V. Talisman, Yu. N. Smirnov. Rural Houses From Local Building Materials and Industrial Products (А. М. Дотлибов, А. В. Талисман, Ю. Н. Смирнов. Сельские жилые дома из местных строительных материалов и индустриальных изделий), USSR, 1971, p. 14. УДК 728.6.
 Newspaper Pravda, USSR (Газета Правда, СССР) July 26, 1971, page 1.
 Newspaper Dagestanskaya Pravda (Dagestan Pravda) (Газета Дагестанская правда, СССР), USSR, 1972, September 26, p. 3.
 Magazine Moskovskii Obozrevatel’ (Moscow Commentator), Russian Federation (Газета Московский обозреватель, Российская Федерация), 1993, No 25, p. 14
 Sociologiheskiye Issledovaniya Goroda (Sociological studies of the city. Bibliographical Index) (Социологические исследования города. Библиографический указатель), Moscow, 1967, p. 74.
 Problemy Zhilishcha Budushchego (Problems of the Housing of the Future. Bibliographical Index) (Проблемы жилища будущего. Библиографический указатель), Moscow, 1968, p. 73.
 Щербаченко, М. Между свободой и стандартом // Архитектура, строительство, дизайн. — 1994.— No. 1. — Pp. 57–61.

 Nekrasov, A., Shcheglov, A. MARKhI XX Century (МАРХИ XX ВЕК) — M. «Салон-Пресс», 2006. Vol. III, Pp. 262,263,366.Издательство "САЛОН-ПРЕСС, МАРХИ XX век. . 
 Nekrasov, A., Shcheglov, A. MARKhI XX Century (МАРХИ XX ВЕК) — M. «Салон-Пресс», 2006. Vol. V, Pp. 235,236,237,394.Издательство "САЛОН-ПРЕСС, МАРХИ XX век. .

External links 

 Gary A. Berkovich Associates
  Dr. Gary Berkovich
 Гари Беркович 

Soviet architects
Ukrainian architects
Jewish architects
20th-century American architects
1935 births
Living people
People from Kharkiv
21st-century American architects